Olimpia Lopes Da Veiga (born 6 May 1985, in Alchochete) is a Portuguese team handball player. She plays for the club Thames Handball Club.

In the 2011/2012 season she represented the Olympia Handball club at the 2011 Women's EHF Challenge Cup in Oliveira do Bairro (Portugal). Her goal tally during the Challenge Cup was 5 goals. During 2011/2012 she was crowned top goalscorer at Thames HC. In 2014/15 she participated again in the Women's EHF Challenge Cup Round 3 where a highly unusual result of identical scores was recorded on both playing dates

References

Portuguese female handball players
1985 births
Living people

Portuguese people of African descent